Rongjiang is a town in Huaping County, Yunnan, China.

Administrative division 
As of 2016, the town is divided into one community and eight villages: 
 Rongjiang Community
 Gaoze
 He'ai
 Zheli
 Longtou
 Hongdi
 Wenquan
 Lashi
 Hongchunjing

History 
Rongjiang was known as "Shijia Village" in ancient times.

In 1821, in the ruling of Daoguang Emperor of the Qing dynasty (1644–1911), a general defeated the Tusi of Surname Gao,  hence the name "Yingjiang Village". Later, it was mistakenly written as "Yingjiang Village" with the similar pronunciation.

After the founding of the Republic of China in 1912, it came under the jurisdiction of the South District. It became a town in 1931 with the name of "Huanan". Its name was changed to "Gaoze" in 1937.

In 1956, it belonged to the 3rd District. It was renamed "Rongjiang People's Commune" in 1958, "Wenquan People's Commune" in 1961, and later "Hongwei People's Commune" in 1966. It became a district in 1984 and was revoked in 1988, while it was split into Rongjiang and Wenquan Yi and Lisu Ethnic Township.

Geography 
The town is situated in the central and southern part of Huaping County.

The town has a total of four reservoirs.

The Liyu River, Xinzhuang River and Zheli River flow through the town.

Economy 
The region's economy is based on agriculture, fishing, and nearby mineral resources. The main crops of the region are rice, followed by corn, potato and wheat. Mango and walnut are the economic plants of this region. The region abounds with coal and limestone.

Demographics 

As of 2017, the National Bureau of Statistics of China estimates the town's population now to be 33,450. The main ethnic groups in the town are Yi, Zhuang, Dai, Miao, and Nakhi.

Transportation 
The G4216 Expressway is a west–east highway in the town.

The China National Highway 353 passes across the town, heading north to the town of Zhongxin.

References

Bibliography 

Divisions of Huaping County